MRO or Mro or variant may refer to:

People
 Mru (disambiguation), peoples and languages also known as Mro
 Mary Rambaran-Olm, Canadian literary historian

Locations 
 Marlborough (disambiguation), some cities named Marlborough use MRO as an abbreviation
 Magdalena Ridge Observatory, a multi-use astronomical observatory near Socorro, New Mexico, United States
 Murchison Radio-astronomy Observatory in outback Western Australia, one of the Square Kilometre Array core sites
 Hood Aerodrome (IATA code MRO), near Masterton, New Zealand

Companies 
 Hokuriku Broadcasting Company, also known as MRO, a broadcasting station in Ishikawa Prefecture, Japan
 Marathon Oil Corporation, listed on the New York Stock Exchange as MRO
 Melrose Industries, listed on the London Stock Exchange as MRO
 MRO Software, a software company best known for its Maximo maintenance management system

Organisations 
 Midwest Reliability Organization, an electrical grid reliability organization
 Oriental Revolutionary Movement (Movimiento Revolucionario Oriental), a Marxist–Leninist communist party in Uruguay
 Mountains and Rivers Order, headquartered at the Zen Mountain Monastery in Mount Tremper, New York
 Macedonian Revolutionary Organization, a revolutionary national liberation organization
 Metsähovi Radio Observatory, an astronomical radio observatory in Kirkkonummi, Finland

Operations and techniques 
 Maintenance, repair and operations (or overhaul), fixing or maintaining any sort of mechanical, plumbing or electrical equipment 
 Main refinancing operations, a technique used by the European Central Bank to control the money supply
 C3 linearization or Method Resolution Order, an algorithm used primarily to obtain the order in which methods should be inherited in the presence of multiple inheritance

Linguistics
 Mro language (ISO 639 code: cmr), a Kukish language of Burma
 Mru language (ISO 639 code: mro), a Sino-Tibetan language of Bangladesh
 Mro (Unicode block), the Unicode block containing characters for writing the Bangladesh Mru language

Other uses 
 Mars Reconnaissance Orbiter, a NASA Mars probe
 Mini Racing Online, an arcade-style, freeware online multiplayer racing game
 The ISO 4217 code for the Mauritanian ouguiya, the currency of Mauritania
 MRO-A, MRO-D, MRO-Z; the MRO-series of RPG weapons
 Mitochondrion-related organelle

See also
 Mr. O (Canadian TV show), 1950s children's show